Nilandhoo Sports Club, is a Maldivian football club in Nilandhoo (Faafu Atoll), that competes in the Dhivehi Premier League, the highest tier of Maldivian football.

History
Nilandhoo was promoted to Dhivehi Premier League as 2018 Minivan Championship semi finalists. They were beaten in the semi-final to runner-up Foakaidhoo FC. Nilandhoo finished above all promoted teams; 6th in their first Premier League campaign in 2018, successfully retaining their spot in the first division.

Management team

References

Football clubs in the Maldives
Dhivehi Premier League clubs